Nizamabad Lok Sabha constituency is one of the 17 Lok Sabha (Lower House of the Parliament) constituencies in Telangana state in southern India.

Dharmapuri Arvind of Bharatiya Janata Party is currently representing the constituency.

Overview
Since its inception in 1952 Nizamabad seat is a Congress  stronghold, various political outfits like the Bharatiya Janata Party and the Telugu Desam Party have won it during different general elections.

After the formation of Telangana the Telangana Rashtra Samithi won the seat for the first time in 2014 General Election.

Assembly segments
Nizamabad Lok Sabha constituency presently comprises the following Legislative Assembly segments:

Members of Parliament

Election results

General Election, 2019

General Election, 2014

General Election, 2009

General Election, 2004

General Election, 1999

General Election, 1998

General Election, 1996

General Election, 1991

Trivia
 The Lok Sabha constituency includes two assembly constituencies from Karimnagar district i.e. Koratla, Jagtial
 Candidates of Indian National Congress have won 11 out of 16 general elections from the constituency.

See also
 Nizamabad district
 List of Constituencies of the Lok Sabha

References

External links
 Nizamabad lok sabha  constituency election 2019 date and schedule

Lok Sabha constituencies in Telangana
Nizamabad district